Phu Xai Lai Leng is a mountain of the Annamite Range in Southeast Asia. It is 2720 metres tall and sits on the international border between Laos and Vietnam. It is one of the ultra prominent peaks of Southeast Asia.

See also
List of Ultras of Southeast Asia

References

Mountains of Laos
Mountains of Vietnam
International mountains of Asia
Laos–Vietnam border